The 2017–18 season is FC Ararat Moscow's first season of existing, during which they will play in the Russian Professional Football League and Russian Cup.

Season events
On 30 July, Sergei Bulatov resigned from his position as manager, with Arkadi Imrekov taking over as caretaker manager. On 16 August 2017, Aleksandr Grigoryan was announced as Ararat's new permanent manager. On 26 October, Grigoryan resigned as the manager with Poghos Galstyan taking over as caretaker manager. On 17 November 2017, Samvel Karapetyan was appointed the president of the club and Igor Zvezdin as the head coach. On 12 April 2018, Zvezdin left the club and was replaced by Maksim Bukatkin.

Transfers

Summer

In:

Out:

Winter

In:

Out:

Squad

Competitions

Russian Professional Football League

Results summary

Results

League table

Russian Cup

Squad statistics

Appearances and goals

|-
|colspan="14"|Players away from Ararat Moscow on loan:
|-
|colspan="14"|Players who left Ararat Moscow during the season:

|}

Goal scorers

Disciplinary Record

References

External links 
 Official VK site

FC Ararat Moscow seasons
Russian football clubs 2017–18 season